Oh No may refer to:

 An exclamation used to indicate shock or dismay, primarily used in the English language

Music
 Oh No (musician) (born 1979), American rapper

Albums 
 Oh No!, 2004 album by Crackout
 Oh No (OK Go album), 2005
 [[Oh No (Jessy Lanza album)|Oh No (Jessy Lanza album)]], 2016
 Oh No (Xiu Xiu album), 2021

Songs
 "Oh No" (Bring Me the Horizon song), 2015
 "Oh No" (Bro'Sis song), 2003
 "Oh No" (Commodores song), 1981
 "Oh No!" (Marina and the Diamonds song), 2010
 "Oh No" (Mos Def and Pharoahe Monch song), 2000
 "Oh No", by Frank Zappa from You Can't Do That on Stage Anymore, Vol. 1 1988 and Weasels Ripped My Flesh, 1970
 "Oh No", by Noreaga from Melvin Flynt – Da Hustler, 1999
 "Oh No", from the compilation album Lyricist Lounge 2, 2000
 "Oh No", by Snoop Dogg featuring 50 Cent from R&G (Rhythm & Gangsta): The Masterpiece, 2004
 "Oh No", by Andrew Bird from Noble Beast, 2009
 "Oh No", by Steam Powered Giraffe from The Vice Quadrant: A Space Opera, 2015
 "Oh No (Sentimental Things)", by So Solid Crew from They Don't Know, 2001
"Oh No", by Daniel Johnston from Retired Boxer, 1985
"Oh No!", by Röyksopp from The Inevitable End'', 2014
 "Oh No", a popular Tiktok motif from the song "Remember (Walking on the Sand)" by the Shangri-Las, sampled and remixed by Capone & Kreepa

See also 
 Uh Oh (disambiguation)
 Ohno (disambiguation)
 Ono (disambiguation)